Kiyan Shahr Metro Station is a station of Tehran Metro Line 6,. It is located at the junction of Salehi St. and Azizkhani St., two local streets in the neighbourhood of Kiyanshahr. The station primarily serves this neighbourhood, with no transit connection. The closes bus stop is approximately 300 m to the north, where lines 316 Shush Metro-Kianshahr and 318 Khorasan Sq.-Kiyanshahr run.

References 

Tehran Metro stations
Railway stations opened in 2020
2020 establishments in Iran